Mohammed bin Ali bin Mohammed Al Mannai is the Qatari Minister of Communications and Information Technology. He was appointed as minister on 19 October 2021.

Education 
Al Mannai holds a Bachelor in Physics from the American University in Cairo.

References 

Living people
21st-century Qatari politicians
Qatari politicians
Government ministers of Qatar
Year of birth missing (living people)

The American University in Cairo alumni